Vladislav Bragin (born 25 January 1998) is a Russian footballer who plays as a forward for Volgar Astrakhan.

Club career

MFK Zemplín Michalovce
In March 2017, he signed contract with Michalovce. Bragin made his professional Fortuna Liga's debut for Zemplín Michalovce on 1 March 2017 against Ružomberok.

AFC Eskilstuna
On 2 April 2019, Bragin joined Swedish club Eskilstuna. After playing only one game for the club it was confirmed on 2 June 2019, that Bragin would leave the club at the end of the month where his contract expired.

SKA-Khabarovsk
He made his Russian Football National League debut for SKA Khabarovsk on 7 July 2019 in a game against Shinnik Yaroslavl. He scored his first FNL goal in the next game on 13 July 2019 in a 2–2 draw with Spartak Moscow 2, but he was also sent off in that game.

References

External links
 
 Futbalnet profile
 

1998 births
Sportspeople from Irkutsk
Living people
Russian footballers
Russia youth international footballers
Association football forwards
FC Krasnodar players
MFK Zemplín Michalovce players
FK Slavoj Trebišov players
AFC Eskilstuna players
FC SKA-Khabarovsk players
FC Volgar Astrakhan players
Slovak Super Liga players
2. Liga (Slovakia) players
Allsvenskan players
Russian First League players
Russian expatriate footballers
Expatriate footballers in Slovakia
Russian expatriate sportspeople in Slovakia
Expatriate footballers in Sweden
Russian expatriate sportspeople in Sweden